The Pakistani intelligence community comprises the various intelligence agencies of Pakistan that work internally and externally to manage, research and collect intelligence necessary for national security. Consolidated intelligence organizations include the personnel and members of the intelligence agencies, military intelligence, and civilian intelligence and analysis directorates operationalized under the executive ministries of the government of Pakistan.

A number of intelligences services are active working on varied intelligence programs including the collection and production of foreign and domestic intelligence, contribute to military planning, and perform espionage. The best known intelligence services are the Inter-Services Intelligence (ISI), Intelligence Bureau (IB), Financial Monitoring Unit (FMU-FIU) and the Federal Investigation Agency (FIA).

Etymology

There are no fixed or official name for the intelligences services of Pakistan as one cooperative federation; all intelligence services operated under their name. Intelligence authors and researchers termed Pakistan's intelligence services as "Pakistan Intelligence Community"  or goes by "Pakistan Intelligence Services and Agencies". The term "Intelligence Community" was first described by the English language newspapers, Frontier Post and Dawn in 1994.
 
Pakistan subsequently made changes in foreign policy after accepting the United States offer of the military assistance and economic aid in return for joining the political alliance system to contain the international communism in 1953. In a secret understanding between President Zia-ul-Haq and President Ronald Reagan, the US Intelligence Community provided a large quantity of espionage equipment, technical information, and intelligence offensive training to the Pakistan Intelligence Community. Initially, the Pakistan Intelligence Community was trained along in British lines, but subsequently CIA trained 200 ISI officers, Pakistan consolidated its intelligence circle under one chain of command and improved its intelligence methods.

Overview of Intelligence Services

National Intelligence Coordination Committee
Established in November 2020, the coordination body created to enhance the coordination and capabilities of Pakistan's intelligence agencies. The organization was inaugurated June 24, 2021.

Inter-Services Intelligence

Established in 1948 by Major-General Robert Cawthome, the Directorate for Inter-Services Intelligence (more commonly known as Inter-Services Intelligence or simply by its initials ISI) is the most premier and largest intelligence service. Primary roles are to consolidate and assess intelligence to senior government and military officials. Intelligence agents are civilians and military officials working together on national security matters. The ISI has been headed by a serving three-star general of the Pakistan Army, who is appointed by the Prime Minister on recommendation of the Chief of Army Staff.

Defence intelligence services

In Pakistan Armed Forces, there are three active-duty uniformed intelligence services. The Air Intelligence reports directly to the Chief of Air Staff and the Air Force leads the appointment of the director-general of the AI.  The Naval Intelligence (NI) also directly under the Chief of Naval Staff, responsible for gaining knowledge on threats on sea and marine vicinity. The NI also used by the Pakistan Marines to conduct their operations. The Military Intelligence is tasked with taking initiatives against counterinsurgency (COIN) operations, identifying and eliminating sleeper cells, foreign military agents and other anti-Pakistani elements within Pakistan. It is under the Chief of Army Staff.

Civil Armed Forces
There are also smaller intelligence units within the Civil Armed Forces:
 Rangers Intelligence Wing
 Three of the Frontier Corps possess Field Intelligence Units:
 Khyber Pakhtunkhwa (North)
 Khyber Pakhtunkhwa (South)
 Balochistan (South)

Intelligence Bureau

The Intelligence Bureau (IB) is an espionage and intelligence cycle management efforts civilian intelligence service. IB is Pakistan's oldest intelligence agency. It is directly under the Prime Minister. Its primary role is to build initiatives, including counter-intelligence and foreign intelligence management. Its Director-General is appointed by the Prime Minister of Pakistan from the civil or the retired officials from the military intelligence services.

Federal Investigation Agency

Established in 1947 as "Special Police Establishment (SPE)", the Federal Investigation Agency (more popularly known as FIA) was later reformed under its current name and structure in 1974 by the Government.  The FIA is a principle investigative intelligence service and mandate to take initiatives against the foreign or national elements working against the national interest of the country. On contrary, it is the civilians intelligence service working under the Ministry of Justice and Ministry of Interior. Its Director-General is appointed by the Prime Minister of Pakistan from the civil intelligence services.

National Intelligence Directorate and others

The National Intelligence Directorate (NID), is a national intelligence estimate authority to integrate foreign, military and domestic intelligence in the national interests of Pakistan.

There are number of civilian intelligence services working under the federal and provincial government of Pakistan. Since 1970s, the intelligence management cycle has been expanded to protect the unity of the country and the national interests abroad.

National Crises Management Cell

Financial Monitoring Unit 
The Financial Monitoring Unit (FMU) is the Financial Intelligence Unit of Pakistan established under the provisions of Anti-Money Laundering Act, 2010 (Previously Anti-Money Laundering Ordinance, 2007). It is an independent intelligence service department of the Government of Pakistan and primarily responsible for analyzing suspicious transactions with respect to money laundering or terrorist financing and building efforts against these critical offenses.

Directorate of Customs Intelligence and Investigation 
Directorate of Customs Intelligence and Investigation was established on 12 August 1957. The (Directorate I&I) was initially centred at Karachi later it was restructured and headquatered in Islamabad as of now. The Directorate serves as the revenue Intelligence of Pakistan that execute its responsibilities under the Federal Board of Revenue. The Directorate is primarily aimed at collecting information regarding tax related offences, smuggling and rendering protection to the economic interest of Pakistan. Its secondary role involves investigation of Salex Tax fraud. Bulk of its rank and file comes from Pakistan Customs and Inland Revenue Service of Pakistan.

Intelligence reforms since 1970s

In 1972–73, Prime Minister Zulfikar Ali Bhutto adopted many recommendations of the Hamoodur Rahman Commission's papers after seeing the intelligence failure in East Pakistan. This led the reformation of the FIA as Prime Minister Bhutto visioned the FIA as equivalent to American FBI which not only protects the country from internal crises but also from foreign suspected threats therefore he established the FIA on the same pattern. In 1970s, Prime Minister Bhutto had the Pakistan intelligence to actively run military intelligence programs in various countries to procure scientific expertise and technical papers in line of Alsos Mission of Manhattan Project.

Both FIA and IB were empowered during the government and the scope of their operation was expanded during 1970s. Though ISI did lost its importance in 1970s, the ISI valued its importance in 1980s after successfully running the military intelligence program against the Soviet Union. Sensing the nature of competition, President Zia-ul-Haq consolidated the intelligence services after the ISI getting training from the CIA in 1980s, and subsequently improved its methods of intelligence.

Budget

The Intelligence budgets are kept as secret; a little information is known in public. In 2012, politicians made unsuccessful efforts to introduce a bill for intelligence services financial funds accountable to the Parliament. It later was withdrawn as it reportedly did not have the concurrence of the special committee of the ruling PPP.

In 2013, the Supreme Court ordered the government to submit the secret funds to public accounts utilized in the past to topple political governments.

According to the reports and research, Prime Minister Zulfikar Ali Bhutto and the PPP spent more than ~$25.8 million on the intelligence services; other reports give vary figures. Between the fiscal year of 1988–90, the Prime Minister Benazir Bhutto and the PPP government spent more than ₨.400 million to buy loyalty of parliamentarians to defeat a no-confidence motion against it, to win elections in Azad Kashmir and to remove the provincial government in the then NWFP to install its chief minister.

Criticisms, controversies, and satire

Since 1990s, the entire intelligence community has been under intense criticism from the international authors and viewers regarding the issues of terrorism, human rights abuses, and methods of intelligence procurements. The intelligence community of Pakistan was first described the English language newspapers, Frontier Post as "invisible government" in an edition published on 18 May 1994. Another English language newspaper, the Dawn, also described the intelligence community as "our secret godfathers" in its opinion section on 25 April 1994. In 2011, the US intelligence community had raised allegations of harbouring Osama bin Laden in Abbottabad. The United States President himself declared: "We think that there had to be some sort of support network for bin Laden inside of Pakistan," Obama said in a "60 Minutes" interview with CBS news. He also added that U.S. was not "sure" "who or what that support network was."

In the period from 2003–2012, it is estimated that 8000 people were kidnapped by Pakistani intelligence services in the Balochistan province. In 2008 alone an estimated 1102 Baloch people disappeared. There have also been reports of torture. The Baloch leaders successfully reached to the Supreme Court intervened in the conflict. The Supreme Court undertook its large investigating the "missing persons" and issued an arrest warrant for the former President Pervez Musharaff. Furthermore, the Chief Justice of the court said the military must act under the government's direction and follow well-defined parameters set by the Constitution.

In June 2011, the prime minister was informed that 41 missing people had returned to their homes, false cases against 38 had been withdrawn and several others had been traced. The PM urged police to trace the missing people and help them to return to their homes. The Supreme Court decided ordered the government to the grant of subsistence allowance to the affected families.

See also

 Senate Committee on Intelligence and National Security

References

 
Pakistan
Pakistan federal departments and agencies